The Zhuhai Championships is an ATP 250 series men's tennis tournament. It is played on outdoor hard courts of the Hengqin International Tennis Center in Zhuhai, Guangdong Province, China, which has 17 outdoor courts and a 5,000-seat stadium. In February 2019, ATP and Huafa Group announced Zhuhai to host the event in September.

Venue 
The Zhuhai Championships will share the same venue of Hengqin International Tennis Center with WTA Elite Trophy and Zhuhai Open.

Past finals

Singles

Doubles

See also 
 WTA Elite Trophy
 Zhuhai Open

References

External links
Official website
ATP Tour tournament profile 

 
Recurring sporting events established in 2019
Tennis tournaments in China
Hard court tennis tournaments
Sport in Zhuhai
2019 establishments in China
Sports competitions in Guangdong